Lucius Cornelius Cinna was a Roman politician. He was consul in 127 BC with Lucius Cassius Longinus Ravilla. 

He possibly served as an envoy in 136 BC to "restrain" Marcus Aemilius Lepidus Porcina from attacking the Hispanic Vaccaei before having been elected to the praetorship some time before 130 BC.

References 

Sources

 
 

2nd-century BC Roman consuls
Cornelii Cinnae